is a Japanese politician of the Liberal Democratic Party, a member of the House of Representatives in the Diet (national legislature). A native of Meguro, Tokyo and graduate of the University of Tokyo, he worked at the Ministry of Posts and Telecommunications,  attending a university in Australia. After unsuccessful runs in 2000 and 2001, he was elected to the House of Representatives for the first time in 2005.

See also 
 Koizumi Children

References

External links 
 Official website in Japanese.

Members of the House of Representatives (Japan)
Koizumi Children
University of Tokyo alumni
Living people
1963 births
People from Meguro
Liberal Democratic Party (Japan) politicians